Mikel Dañobeitia Martín (born 5 March 1986 in Barakaldo, Basque Country) is a Spanish footballer who plays mainly as a forward.

Club career
An Athletic Bilbao youth graduate, Dañobeitia served some loans (including at its farm team, CD Basconia), before being promoted to the main squad for the 2005–06 season. He made his La Liga debut on 26 October 2005, playing 70 minutes in a 2–3 away loss against CA Osasuna.

After a relatively successful first year, Dañobeitia only appeared in four matches in his second, being released and joining UD Salamanca in the second division. In the 2008–09 campaign, he reunited with former Athletic youth teammate Gorka Azkorra.

In July 2009, Dañobeitia moved to another club in that level, joining Córdoba CF. After only six games in his second season, he left the Andalusians and signed for UD Logroñés in division three.

References

External links

1986 births
Living people
Spanish footballers
Footballers from Barakaldo
Association football forwards
La Liga players
Segunda División players
Segunda División B players
Tercera División players
Danok Bat CF players
CD Basconia footballers
Bilbao Athletic footballers
Athletic Bilbao footballers
Sestao River footballers
UD Salamanca players
Córdoba CF players
UD Logroñés players
Barakaldo CF footballers
Basque Country international footballers
Club Portugalete players